New Hope (NE) is a political party in Macau. Its leader, José Pereira Coutinho, has served in the Legislative Assembly since 2005. In the most recent election on 12 September 2021, the party won 13.81% of the popular vote and 2 out of 14 directly elected seats.

Elected AL members 
 José Pereira Coutinho, 2005–present
 Leong Veng Chai, 2013–2017
 Che Sai Wang, 2021–present

Legislative Assembly elections

References 

Political parties in Macau
Political parties of minorities